The 1990–91 Arkansas Razorbacks men's basketball team represented the University of Arkansas in the 1990–91 college basketball season. The head coach was Nolan Richardson, serving for his sixth year. The team played its home games in Barnhill Arena in Fayetteville, Arkansas. This was Arkansas's final season in the Southwest Conference. The school joined the Southeastern Conference the next season. The Hogs won their third straight, and final, SWC regular season and conference tournament championships. Arkansas was the #1 seed in the Southeast Regional of the NCAA tournament, and defeated Georgia State, Arizona State, and Alabama, before losing to the Kansas Jayhawks in the Elite Eight.

Roster

Schedule and results

|-
!colspan=9 style=| Exhibition Games

|-
!colspan=9 style=| Regular season

|-
!colspan=9 style=| SWC Tournament

|-
!colspan=9 style=| NCAA Tournament

Sources

Rankings

Awards and honors
Todd Day – Second-Team AP All-American, SWC co-Player of the Year
Lee Mayberry – Honorable Mention AP All-American
Oliver Miller – Honorable Mention AP All-American, SWC co-Player of the Year
Nolan Richardson – SWC Coach of the Year

References

Arkansas
Arkansas Razorbacks men's basketball seasons
Arkansas
Razor
Razor